Panagiotis Konstantinidis (born 16 November 1969) is a retired Greek football defender.

References

1969 births
Living people
Greek footballers
Pierikos F.C. players
Kalamata F.C. players
Panionios F.C. players
A.O. Kerkyra players
Super League Greece players
Association football defenders